

Roonka Conservation Park is a protected area in the Australian state of South Australia located in the gazetted locality of Blanchetown about  north of the Blanchetown town centre.

The conservation park is located on land in sections 4 and 5 in the cadastral unit of the Hundred of Hay on the western side of the Murray River. It was constituted under the National Parks and Wildlife Act 1972 on 27 July 1978.

In 1980, it was described as follows:Roonka Conservation Park contains a most important archaeological site, spanning about 18,000 years. It has yielded evidence of an extremely wide variety of mortuary practices, a large range of archaeological phenomena and a long cultural sequence. The site has been excavated over more than a decade by the South Australian Museum. 

The conservation park is classified as an IUCN Category III protected area. In 1980, it was listed on the now-defunct Register of the National Estate.

See also
Protected areas of South Australia

References

External links
Webpage for Roonka Conservation Park on the Protected Planet website
Webpage for Roonka Conservation Park on the BirdsSA website

Conservation parks of South Australia
Protected areas established in 1978
1978 establishments in Australia
South Australian places listed on the defunct Register of the National Estate